Clanton Park is a 77-acre urban park at 1520 Clanton Road in the West Boulevard neighborhood of Charlotte, North Carolina.  It features playgrounds, fields for soccer and softball, eleven basketball courts, picnic shelters, and a gazebo.  The park also manages the nearby Clanton community pavilion, a 4,500 square foot indoor facility at 3132 Manchester Avenue. A half-mile section of the Irwin Creek Greenway runs through Clanton Park.

Arbor Glen Outreach Center
Located in Clanton Park is the Arbor Glen Outreach Center.  This facility, which contains classrooms and a gymnasium, sponsors programs for pre-schoolers, children, teens, adults, and seniors.  Activities include sports, fitness, self-defense, dance, tutoring, cultural arts, and community meetings.  The center hosts the Boys To Men Foundation, a mentoring program for at-risk youth, a 4-H club, and meetings of National Night Out, a community-police awareness-raising event.

References

External links
 Map of Clanton Park

Parks in Charlotte, North Carolina